Krizza Nikka Neri (born June 28, 1995) is a Filipina singer. She won at Protégé: The Battle for the Big Break, a singing competition on GMA Network.

Biography

Early life
Neri is the daughter of a professional singer.

In 2008 she performed in the Mindanao Pop Idol singing contest and placed second. Neri used an uploaded video of herself singing on YouTube.

Krizza was a fan of Kapuso Actresses Kris Bernal and Jennica Garcia before joining Protégé.

2011: Protégé
On August 10, 2011, she auditioned for Aiza Seguerra at SM City, Cagayan de Oro. Seguerra chose Neri, Mark Gregory King and Zibrille Pepito as potential protégés. Neri won a face-off competition by singing "No One" to become Seguerra's official protégé. Neri was the first grand winner of Protégé: The Battle for the Big Break even though she had been twice in the bottom two.

When she was declared as the grand winner of the show, she willingly shared her condo unit with Lovely Embuscado, the protégé of Jaya.

2012–present: Krizza
After winning Protégé: The Battle For The Big Break, Krizza was welcomed in the Sunday musical variety show, Party Pilipinas. She became a regular performer until the show's cancellation. Neri released her self-titled debut studio album on June 19, 2012. Her debut single, "Ba't 'Di Ko Ba Nasabi?" was used as an original soundtrack for GMA's afternoon program The Good Daughter,  top-billed by Kylie Padilla and Rocco Nacino. Krizza is produced by Blackbird Music and distributed under Universal Records.

Discography
2012: Krizza

Tours
2012: The Protégé and the Mentor

Filmography

Television

See also
Jonalyn Viray
Gerald Santos
Maricris Garcia
Gretchen Espina
Frencheska Farr

References

1995 births
Living people
21st-century Filipino women singers
People from Cagayan de Oro
Singers from Misamis Oriental
Participants in Philippine reality television series
Reality show winners
Protégé (TV series) participants
GMA Network personalities
Universal Records (Philippines) artists